Dom Rustan (also Romanized as Dom Rūstān; also known as Dom Rāstān and Dūm-ī-Rausān) is a village in Tarhan-e Sharqi Rural District, Tarhan District, Kuhdasht County, Lorestan Province, Iran. At the 2006 census, its population was 1,568, in 309 families.

References 

Towns and villages in Kuhdasht County